Malherbe's parakeet (Cyanoramphus malherbi), usually known as the orange-fronted parakeet, is a small parrot endemic to New Zealand. In New Zealand it is always known as the orange-fronted parakeet, a name it shares with a species from Central America, while in the rest of the world it is known as Malherbe's parakeet. Restricted to a few valleys in the South Island and four offshore islands, its population declined to around 200 in the 1990s, and it is considered critically endangered.

Taxonomy
The genus Cyanoramphus is endemic to New Zealand and surrounding islands and it has been proposed that the ancestor of Cyanoramphus dispersed from New Caledonia to New Zealand via Norfolk Island 500,000 years ago.

Controversy has surrounded the classification of this bird; is it its own species or a colour morph of the similar yellow-crowned parakeet (C. auriceps)? It was described in 1857 from a museum specimen of unknown origin; its species name honours the French ornithologist Alfred Malherbe. During the late 1800s ornithologists considered it to be a distinct species, but during the latter half of the 20th century it was often considered a colour morph; as recently as 1990, the Ornithological Society of New Zealand listed it as a form of C. auriceps. After analysis using molecular genetic methods in 2000, the current consensus among researchers, which is accepted by the New Zealand Department of Conservation, is that Cyanoramphus malherbi is a distinct species.

Description 

Cyanoramphus malherbi is a medium size parrot, approximately 20 centimetres long. Its body is primarily a bright blue-green, with azure blue primary covert and leading edge feathers on its wings.

It has a distinctive (and diagnostic) orange frontal band on its yellow crown, but this is absent in juvenile birds, which have fully green heads. The orange frontal band begins to develop when the bird is 2–5 weeks old. Its rump has orange patches on the sides. Colouration in males tends to be brighter, and juveniles are distinctly duller.

The only reliable features that separate mature orange-fronted parakeets from the similar yellow-crowned parakeet (C. auriceps) are the colour of the frontal band and rump.

Distribution and habitat 
The species is found in only three regions on New Zealand's South Island: the South Branch Hurunui River valley, Hawdon River valley, and the Poulter valley. In addition, there are four translocated populations, found on Maud Island, Blumine Island, Chalky Island, and Mayor Island / Tuhua.

In the South Island, the parakeet is predominantly found only in Nothofagus/Fuscospora (beech) forest with some reports from alpine and subalpine tussock and open matagouri shrubland.

On Maud Island, one study found that the parakeet prefers areas with greater canopy cover and lower understory and ground cover. The species is not restricted to this type of forest, however, and as its population density increases it may make more use of other habitats.

Behaviour 
The parakeet is most often observed foraging, preening, and resting. They prefer the upper stratum of forests, but also frequent lower strata more often than C. auriceps.

Diet and feeding 
The orange-fronted parakeet typically feeds in the canopy of New Zealand beech trees, but will also forage in low vegetation and on the ground. They are typically observed feeding in flocks of mixed species, eating various seeds, beech flowers, buds and invertebrates.

During spring, invertebrates become a significant part of their diet, including leaf roller moth and fungus moth caterpillars, other Lepidoptera, and aphids. They have been observed feeding on herbs and ferns on the ground, including Pratia, Oreomyrrhis colensoi, Parahebe lyallii, Leptinella maniototo and Blechnum penna-marina. During mast years, beech seeds become the dominant feature of their diet.

The Maud Island population appears to have different dietary preferences to mainland populations, eating more plant species and fewer invertebrates.

Breeding 
Orange-fronted parakeets are monogamous and able to nest year round, but peak breeding is between December and April. They primarily nest in natural hollows or cavities of mature beech trees, preferring red beech (Fuscospora fusca). On Maud Island they were found to nest in Pinus radiata forests.

Clutch size is around 7 eggs with an incubation period of 21–26 days. The female exclusively incubates and the male feeds her. Nestlings fledge between 43 and 71 days, but remain dependent for 2–4 weeks.

Their breeding is also linked to the production of beech seed during mast years. During seeding events, and other periods where food is plentiful, they are able to produce secondary clutches, with some pairs reportedly breeding up to four times in succession.

Status 
The orange-fronted parakeet was classified as Nationally Endangered by the New Zealand Department of Conservation in 2012 and Critically Endangered by the IUCN.

In the 19th century the species was widespread, occurring throughout New Zealand's South Island. The birds were semi-nomadic, dispersing in search of food when numbers were high. This behaviour has stopped due to low numbers and habitat modification, which also has implications for re-establishment of the species.

Prior to 2000, the parrot's population numbered in the hundreds in the South Island, but fell from 500–700 individuals to an estimated 100–200 by 2004, due to significant increases in rat and stoat populations, in particular a rat plague during 2001.

The Hawdon River valley houses the largest population, with 70–200 individuals reported in 2013, but numbers are apparently decreasing. The Poulter valley population also declined in 2013, with approximately 40–80 individuals now occurring in this region. The South Branch Hurunui River valley population is even smaller, as few as 20–40 birds.

The world population of this species was estimated to be 290–690 individuals in 2013, with translocated island populations making up 160–420 of these birds. Determining exact numbers of the parakeet is difficult, however, due to their rarity, quiet nature, and similarities to C. auriceps.

Threats 
The original decline in population was most likely due to habitat destruction and fragmentation by human activity, hunting, and predation from exotic species. Hunting has ceased and their habitat is protected, but habitat fragmentation may also continue to threaten the orange-fronted parakeet.

Orange-fronted parakeets evolved in isolation from land mammals, so are especially vulnerable to introduced predators. Their current decline is due to predation from stoats (Mustela ermine), rats (Rattus spp.), and brushtail possums (Trichosurus vulpecula)  which target eggs and nestlings. One population was reduced by 85% in 2001 due to predator irruption after a beech mast (a season of high production by southern beech). Deer and possums also contribute to C. malherbi decline through forest destruction.

Competition for food may also be a factor. Introduced birds, mice, wasps, and rats are considerably reducing invertebrate numbers, which the parakeet relies on during winter and spring. The parakeet is however a food generalist and may compensate with other food sources, as observed on Maud Island. This dietary flexibility is promising for species recovery.

Inbreeding depression and low genetic diversity may affect the viability of these small populations by reducing their capacity to adapt threats and diseases.

The specialised nesting habitat of the orange-fronted parakeet increases its vulnerability to extinction. The reasons for this include: (1) a single nest opening means that incubating females may be unable to escape from invading predators and will also be killed, (2) because only females incubate, predation may cause a biased sex ratio, (3) their relatively long nesting period (when compared to other passerines) increases their vulnerability to predation, and (4) the chicks tend to be noisy and therefore more attractive to predators. Furthermore, in beech silviculture the trees are not given enough time to develop adequate hollows before they are harvested, thereby reducing the number of suitable nesting sites in managed beech forests. Introduced starlings may also be outcompeting the parrot for nesting sites.

Conservation 
Malherbe's parakeet is absolutely protected under New Zealand's Wildlife Act 1953. The species is also listed under Appendix II of the Convention on International Trade in Endangered Species of Wild Fauna and Flora (CITES) meaning international export/import (including parts and derivatives) is regulated.

Predator management is the main strategy to reverse this species' decline. All three mainland populations come under the "Operation Ark" initiative, which controls stoat, possum and rat populations through integrated pest management, with particular focus on reducing the effect of predator plagues. These pest management strategies have worked with other New Zealand bird species to reduce predation by introduced mammals.

Individual nest sites are also protected from predators using metal tree-trunk wraps; this has been a successful programme and only one nest out of 153 has been lost to predators since 2003.

The other major conservation strategy is captive breeding programmes carried out at Peacock Springs by the Isaac Wildlife Trust, with individuals being released on predator-free islands. Birds are placed in portable aviaries in the forest to acclimatise them before release.

A total of 45 birds were released between 2005 and 2007 on Chalky Island, off the coast of Fiordland. The local population had increased to 150 individuals in 2009, and 100–200 by 2011, but had declined to 50–150 individuals in 2013.

Sixty-eight individuals were released on Maud Island in the Marlborough Sounds between 2007 and 2009, but 2013 the island's population consisted of only 10–20 birds.

Orange-fronted parakeets have also been translocated to Mayor Island / Tuhua in the Bay of Plenty and Blumine Island in the Marlborough Sounds; estimated population in 2013 were 50–150 and 50–100 birds respectively. These two populations, however, are not as well studied as those on Chalky Island and Maud Island.

References

External links
 Orange-fronted parakeet discussed on RadioNZ's Critter of the Week, 24 February 2017
 Films of the Malherbe's Parakeet at the Cornell Lab of Ornithology

Malherbe's parakeet
Malherbe's parakeet
Birds of the South Island
Malherbe's parakeet
Endemic birds of New Zealand
Parrots of Oceania